An Introduction to Hegel: Freedom, Truth and History is a book by the philosopher Stephen Houlgate in which the author provides an introduction to the philosophy of Hegel.

Reception
David Kolb, Howard Williams and Terry Pinkard reviewed the book.
Simon Lumsden calls it "the most straightforward introduction to Hegel's thought."

References

External links 
An Introduction to Hegel: Freedom, Truth and History

2005 non-fiction books
English-language books
Books about Georg Wilhelm Friedrich Hegel
Wiley-Blackwell books